Craniodicticus mucronatus, is a species of weevil endemic to Sri Lanka.

References 

Curculionidae
Insects of Sri Lanka
Insects described in 1895